Fabricio Perren is a Grand Prix motorcycle racer from Argentina.

Career statistics

By season

Races by year
(key)

References

External links
 Profile on motogp.com

1988 births
Living people
Argentine motorcycle racers
125cc World Championship riders
250cc World Championship riders